Matt Cottrell (born 29 February 2000) is an Australian rules footballer who plays for the Carlton Football Club in the Australian Football League (AFL). He was recruited by the Carlton Football Club through the 2019 Pre-season supplemental selection period.

Early football
Cottrell played football for the Pearcedale Football Club. He played for the Dandenong Stingrays in the NAB League for the 2017 and 2018 seasons. Although Cottrell only played 2 games in 2017, he cemented his spot in 2018 and played 19 games. He is the grandson of former  player Len Cottrell.

AFL career
Cottrell was not selected in either the national or rookie draft, but trained with and was then recruited to the Carlton Football Club in February 2019 in the pre-season supplemental selection period. After playing his entire first season in Carlton's , the Northern Blues, he made his senior AFL debut in Round 11, 2020, against  in one of three matches Carlton played in a Perth quarantine hub during the pandemic-interrupted 2020 season. Later that season, in just his fifth career match, Cottrell kicked the winning goal two minutes from the final siren a come-from-behind victory against , in which Carlton conceded the first seven goals of the game before recovering to win 8.9 (57) to 8.4 (52).

Statistics
 Statistics are correct to the end of Round 23 2022

|- style="background-color: #eaeaea"
! scope="row" style="text-align:center" | 2019
|  || 46 || 0 || — || — || — || — || — || — || — || — || — || — || — || — || — || —
|- style="background-color: #EAEAEA"
! scope="row" style="text-align:center" | 2020
|style="text-align:center;"|
| 46 || 5 || 2 || 0 || 44 || 9 || 53 || 8 || 4 || 0.4 || 0.0 || 8.8 || 1.8 || 10.6 || 1.6 || 0.8
|-
! scope="row" style="text-align:center" | 2021
|style="text-align:center;"|
| 46 || 14 || 3 || 2 || 118 || 47 || 165 || 37 || 31 || 0.2 || 0.1 || 8.4 || 3.3 || 11.7 || 2.6 || 2.2
|-
! scope="row" style="text-align:center" | 2022
|style="text-align:center;"|
| 46 || 18 || 9 || 2 || 159 || 108 || 267 || 71 || 32 || 0.5 || 0.1 || 8.8 || 6.0 || 14.8 || 3.9 || 1.7
|-
|class="sortbottom" colspan=3 | Career
| 37
| 14
| 4
| 321
| 164
| 485
| 116
| 67
| 0.3
| 0.1
| 8.6
| 4.4
| 13.1
| 3.1
| 1.8
|}

References

External links

2000 births
Living people
Australian rules footballers from Melbourne
Dandenong Stingrays players
Carlton Football Club players
Preston Football Club (VFA) players